Mirzabad is a village in Bhanwarkol Block in Ghazipur district of Uttar Pradesh in India.

Villages in Ghazipur district